Events from the year 1953 in Iran.

Incumbents
 Shah: Mohammad Reza Pahlavi 
 Prime Minister: Mohammad Mosaddegh (until August 19), Fazlollah Zahedi (starting August 19)

Events

February
 The 6.6  Torud earthquake shook northern Iran with a maximum Mercalli intensity of VIII (Severe). Between 800–973 were killed and 140 were injured.

August
 1953 Iranian coup d'état – Overthrow of Prime Minister Mohammad Mosaddegh.

Births

Date unknown
Hamid Ahmadieh, Iranian ophthalmologist, medical scientist, and medical pioneer

References

 
Iran
Years of the 20th century in Iran
1950s in Iran
Iran